Pierre-Jean Verzelen (born 29 August 1983) is a French politician from The Republicans. He was elected Senator for Aisne on 27 September 2020.

References 

1983 births
Living people
Senators of Aisne
21st-century French politicians
The Republicans (France) politicians

Mayors of places in France
French Senators of the Fifth Republic